Marc Bureau may refer to:

 Marc Bureau (ice hockey) (born 1966), former NHL player
 Marc Bureau (politician) (born 1955), Quebec municipal politician